Events in the year 2018 in Kuwait.

Incumbents
Emir: Sabah Al-Ahmad Al-Jaber Al-Sabah 
Prime Minister: Jaber Al-Mubarak Al-Hamad Al-Sabah

Events

January to May – A diplomatic crisis developed between the countries of Kuwait and the Philippines over concerns of the latter over the situation of Filipino migrant workers in Kuwait. 

 May 29 – Kuwait blocks draft United Nation Security Council US sanction attack on Israel.

Deaths

7 January – Meshary Al-Arada, singer and composer (b. 1982).
12 August – Frayha Al-Ahmad, Kuwaiti royalty (b. 1944).
25 September – Ismail Fahd Ismail, novelist (b. 1940).

References

 
2010s in Kuwait
Years of the 21st century in Kuwait
Kuwait
Kuwait